Mia Oremović (31 July 1918 – 24 July 2010) was a Croatian theatre, film and television actress.

Selected filmography
It Was Not in Vain (1957)
H-8 (1958)
I Have Two Mothers and Two Fathers (1968)
One Song a Day Takes Mischief Away (1970)

References

External links

1918 births
2010 deaths
People from Požega, Croatia
Croatian film actresses
Croatian stage actresses
Croatian television actresses
Golden Arena winners
Vladimir Nazor Award winners
Yugoslav actresses
Burials at Mirogoj Cemetery